John Austrheim (10 October 1912 –  13 April 1995) was a Norwegian politician, farmer for the Centre Party.

Born in Gloppen, Sogn og Fjordane, Austrheim had no more than a primary education, and worked as a farmer when he was elected mayor of his municipality Gloppen in 1955. He had previously been a municipality council member from 1945 to 1951, and served as mayor until 1962. In 1967 he was elected leader of the Centre Party, a position he took over after Per Borten, who was serving as Prime Minister at the time. Austrheim held this post until 1973.

He was elected to the Norwegian Parliament from Østfold in 1961, and was re-elected on three occasions. He had previously served in the position of deputy representative during the term 1958–1961. Borten's Cabinet resigned in 1971, but when the Centre Party returned to power on 18 October 1972, Austrheim was appointed Minister of Transport and Communications in the new cabinet of Lars Korvald. He served in this position until the government resigned on 16 October 1973. During his time in cabinet he was replaced in the Norwegian Parliament by Ambjørg Sælthun and, briefly, Leiv Erdal.

References

1912 births
1995 deaths
Government ministers of Norway
Centre Party (Norway) politicians
Mayors of places in Sogn og Fjordane
Members of the Storting
Place of death missing
People from Gloppen
Ministers of Transport and Communications of Norway
20th-century Norwegian politicians